Benny Glaser (born June 7, 1989) is a professional poker player from Southampton, UK.  He has won four bracelets at the World Series of Poker (WSOP). Overall his total live poker tournament winnings exceed $3,500,000, and his online poker winnings exceed $1,800,000.

World Series of Poker 
Glaser has won four events and made 15 final tables at the WSOP. He won his first bracelet in 2015, playing limit Triple Draw Lowball.

In 2016, Glaser won two bracelets in Omaha High-Low Split in the same week. First, he won the $1,500 event, then four days later won the $10,000 Championship.  Glaser joined Jason Mercier and Ian Johns as two-time winners at the 2016 World Series of Poker. In 2021, Glaser won the $10,000 Razz Championship.

Glaser's four bracelets are the most by any player from Great Britain.

World Series of Poker bracelets

World Championship of Online Poker 

Glaser's poker success isn't just limited to live poker. He's also won several titles in some of the most prestigious online tournaments series in the world. In the World Championship of Online Poker (WCOOP), Glaser has eight titles. His first WCOOP title came in 2018 when he won WCOOP-27-L: $55 PLO [6-Max], $100K Gtd for $23,807. On PokerStars, Glaser plays under the alias "RunGodlike." Through 2021, Glaser's largest WCOOP win came in WCOOP-55-H: $2,100 HORSE, $150K Gtd at the 2020 WCOOP when he won $43,055. In 2022 he added a further four titles to his haul.

World Championship of Online Poker titles

Spring Championship of Online Poker 

In addition to his WCOOP titles, Glaser has seven Spring Championship of Online Poker (SCOOP) titles. His first SCOOP title was won in 2016 when he won SCOOP-33-H: $2,100 Stud Hi/Lo, $75K Guaranteed for $54,390. Glaser also won SCOOP titles in 2018, 2019, 2020, and 2021. In 2019, Glaser was the winner of two SCOOP titles. He first won SCOOP 13-M: $215 FL Triple Draw 2-7, $75K Gtd for $14,667 and later in the same series won SCOOP 41-H: $1,050 8-Game, $150K Gtd for $45,840.

Spring Championship of Online Poker titles

References

External links
Poker Update interview
ESPN feature

English poker players
Living people
Sportspeople from Southampton
World Series of Poker bracelet winners
1989 births